The Sablatnig C.II was a conventional C-type reconnaissance two-seater aircraft developed and built by Sablatnig in Berlin, Germany in 1918.

Design
It was a two-bay biplane of conventional design, with staggered wings, two open cockpits in tandem, and fixed, tailskid undercarriage. The C.II was of wooden construction with a plywood covered fuselage and fabric coverings. Unlike the C.I, the C.II used a Maybach Mb.IV. Two additional prototypes were built with different strut arrangements and elevators.

Specifications

References

1910s German military reconnaissance aircraft
Sablatnig aircraft
Single-engined tractor aircraft
Biplanes
Aircraft first flown in 1918